Sektenmuzik was a Berlin-based independent record label until mid-2012, formed by German rappers Sido and B-Tight.

Sektenmuzik was founded at the end of 2006 and beginning of 2007 by Sido and B-Tight, also known as the duo A.i.d.S. The duo was formed from the rap crew Die Sekte, which has been active since 1998. It includes Sido, B-Tight, Rhymin Simon, and Vokalmatador.

Artists 
The following artists were former Sektenmuzik artists:
 B-Tight
 Tony D
 Alpa Gun
 Bendt
 Fuhrmann 
 Greckoe
 Freddy Cool
 Koeppen
 Schmökill
 Viruz
 Diego (producer)
 DJ Werd (DJ)

The following artists are members of Die Sekte, but are signed to another label:
 Sido (signed to Universal)
 MOK (released three times over Sektenmuzik)

Release

Albums 

German record labels